Kabutardan (also Romanized as Kabūtardān; also known as Kabūtūdān) is a village in Pazevar Rural District, Rudbast District, Babolsar County, Mazandaran Province, Iran. At the 2006 census, its population was 842, in 218 families.

References 

Populated places in Babolsar County